The Rostock Art Gallery was opened on 15 May 1969 as a museum of contemporary art in Rostock in the German federal state of Mecklenburg-Vorpommern. It is in the grounds of the park around the Schwanenteich lake in the quarter of Reutershagen.

Exhibitions 
Georg Baselitz, Gotthard Graubner, Gerhard Richter, Günther Uecker — Credo — paintings
Andreas Mühe — photography
Otto Niemeyer-Holstein — Evviva la pittura — Es lebe die paintings  — paintings
Richard Serra — Paperworks — sketches and printed graphic art
Walter Schels and Beate Lakotta — Noch mal Leben — photography and texts
Norbert Bisky, Peggy Buth, Katharina Grosse, Gregor Hildebrandt, Antje Majewski, Thomas Rentmeister, Thomas Scheibitz and Amelie von Wulffen — Portfolio Berlin 01 — paintings and objects
Paolo Roversi — Studio — photography
A. R. Penck — Werke aus der Sammlung Böckmann — paintings
Pop-Art aus dem Reich der Mitte — All the great modern things: China Total — paintings and objects
Wolfgang Joop — Eternal Love — photography and objects
Paul Wunderlich — Die Radierungen und Sammlung Székessy — etchings
Ernst Barlach and Alexander Dettmar — Zwiesprache — sculptures and pictures
Robert Rauschenberg — Close encounter
Robert Rauschenberg — Seo — pictures
Bert de Beul — Bilder 2002–2007  — paintings
Camille Claudel  — sculptures and sketches
Christo and Jeanne-Claude — The Pont Neuf, Wrapped / Over the River  — objects, graphical art, and photography

Further reading 
 Andreas Haucap/Harald Schiller (Hrsg.): Museen zwischen Weimar and Stralsund. Ein Streifzug durch die Museumslandschaft der neuen Bundesländer, Hamburg 1990, Igen-Verlag. . (Enthält einen Artikel von Dr. Luise Hartmann, der ehemaligen Direktorin der Kunsthalle Rostock über die Geschichte des Hauses in der DDR.)
 Hansestadt Rostock; Freunde der Kunsthalle Rostock e.V. (Hrsg.): Kunsthalle Rostock 1969–2009. Rostock 2009. Ingo Koch Verlag. .

References

External links 
 Rostock Art Gallery website

ArtGallery
Buildings and structures completed in 1969
Art museums established in 1969
Contemporary art galleries in Germany
Museums in Mecklenburg-Western Pomerania
ArtGallery
1969 establishments in East Germany
Art galleries established in 1969
ArtGallery